g Herculis is a binary star system in the northern constellation of Hercules. It has the Flamsteed designation 30 Herculis, while g Herculis is the Bayer designation. This system is visible to the naked eye as a faint, red-hued point of light. The system is moving further from the Earth with a heliocentric radial velocity of 1.5 km/s.

The visible component is an aging red giant on the asymptotic giant branch with a stellar classification of M6− III. According to Samus et al. (2017), it is a semiregular variable of subtype SRb, which ranges between visual magnitudes 4.3 and 6.3 over 89.2 days. It displays cyclical periods of 62.3, 89.5, and 888.9 days. The star is surrounded by a circumstellar dust shell that seems primarily composed of oxides of iron, magnesium, and aluminium, rather than silicates.

References

M-type giants
Asymptotic-giant-branch stars
Semiregular variable stars
Spectroscopic binaries
Hercules (constellation)
Herculis, g
Durchmusterung objects
Herculis, 030
148783
080704
6146